Nesterovo is a rural locality (a selo) in Pribaykalsky District, Republic of Buryatia, Russia. The population was 540 as of 2010. There are 8 streets.

Geography 
Nesterovo is located 29 km northeast of Turuntayevo (the district's administrative centre) by road. Gurulevo is the nearest rural locality.

References 

Rural localities in Okinsky District